Lucía Spangenberg is a bioinformatician researcher in Uruguay at the Pasteur Institute of Montevideo and co-founder of the biotech startup GenLives. In 2016, she was named one of the 35 Innovators Under 35 by the MIT Technology Review. She also teaches at the Catholic University of Uruguay.

References 

Uruguayan women scientists

Living people

Year of birth missing (living people)
Uruguayan people of German descent